Cyperus nayaritensis is a species of sedge that is native to south western parts of Mexico.

See also 
 List of Cyperus species

References 

nayaritensis
Plants described in 1983
Flora of Mexico